Pillaiyar Suḻi, also rendered Ganesha's curl, is sacred textual symbol. Various Tamil Hindus usually write it at the beginning of diaries, notebooks, and invitations before writing anything new. It is primarily found in South India and Sri Lanka. It is dedicated to deity Pillaiyar (Ganesha), who believed that the Pillaiyar Suḻi symbolises an auspicious beginning. It is similar to the Tamil and Malayalam letter உ,ഉ(u). Pillaiyar is ritually worshiped first with prayers for success in various traditions of Hinduism.

Sri Vaishnavas believe that this “௳” sign represents the goddess Lakshmi, and it is an alternative for writing Shri - (Tamil:ஸ்ரீ, Sanskrit:श्री), a Sanskrit term that means the same.

References 

Tamil culture
Hindu symbols
Tamil languages
Tamil Hindu literature
Indian culture
Ganesha
Hindu iconography
Indian iconography
Indian art
Hindu art
Tamil art